Rendezvous is a data synchronization mechanism in Plan 9 from Bell Labs. It is a system call that allows two processes to exchange a single datum while synchronizing. 

The rendezvous call takes a tag and a value as its arguments. The tag is typically an address in memory shared by both processes. Calling rendezvous causes a process to sleep until a second rendezvous call with a matching tag occurs. Then, the values are exchanged and both processes are awakened.

More complex synchronization mechanisms can be created from this primitive operation. See also mutual exclusion.

See also
 Synchronous rendezvous
 Communicating sequential processes

External links 
Process Sleep and Wakeup on a Shared-memory Multiprocessor by Rob Pike, Dave Presotto, Ken Thompson and Gerard Holzmann.

Plan 9 from Bell Labs
Parallel computing
Inter-process communication